= Nyctophila heydeni =

Scientific classification
- Domain: Eukaryota
- Kingdom: Animalia
- Phylum: Arthropoda
- Class: Insecta
- Order: Coleoptera
- Suborder: Polyphaga
- Infraorder: Elateriformia
- Family: Lampyridae
- Genus: Nyctophila
- Species: N. heydeni

Binomial name
- Nyctophila heydeni Olivier, 1884
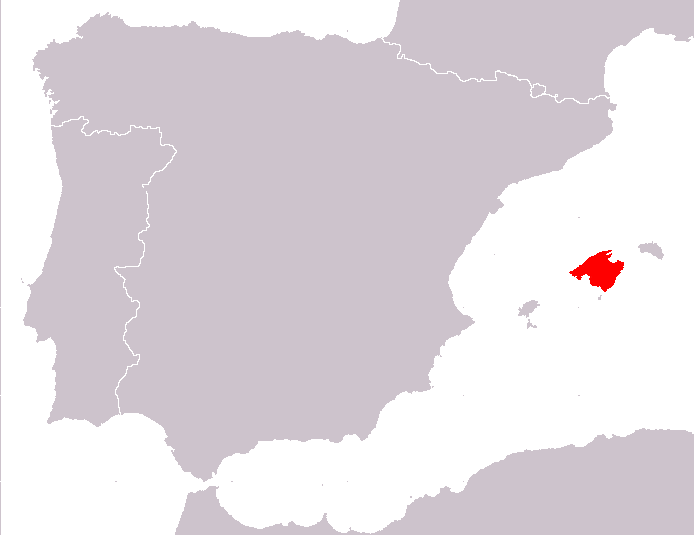

Species of firefly

Nyctophila heydeni, the Balearic firefly, is a species of firefly. The species is present in the island of Mallorca where it could be an endemism.
